Kiladigalu is a 1994 Indian Kannada-language comedy film directed by Dwarakish and produced by M. K. Srinivasamurthy. Starring Vishnuvardhan and Dwarakish in dual roles, the film also featured Swarna, Sriraksha, Avinash and B. C. Patil in prominent roles. The music for the film was scored by Raj–Koti. Few sequences of the movie were partially based on the Marathi film Aamchya Sarkhe Aamhich. The famous cycle-chase sequence from the 1983 Hong Kong film Project A, was used in this film. The same sequence was later used in the 2012 Hindi film Barfi!.

Synopsis
Hari and Krishna's chikkappa (uncle) plots to murder them to amass their wealth with the help of the family lawyer and his friend, Diwan. However, Diwan and the lawyer manages to save them and replace two look-alike conmen in their place. Little does the lawyer know that Diwan has a secret plan to usurp the brothers' wealth.

Cast
 Vishnuvardhan (dual role) - Kittappa "Kittu" / Krishna 
 Dwarakish (dual role) - Puttappa "Puttu" / Hari 
 Swarna - Dr. Deepa 
 Sriraksha - Roopa 
 Avinash - Chikkaraja
 B. C. Patil - lawyer Diwan
 Ramesh Bhat as inspector Madhava
 Sihi Kahi Chandru as Inspector Chandru
 Anjana as Inspector Anjana
B. Jayamma 
 Jyothi Gurucharan as Muthamma
Bangalore Nagesh 
Mandeep Rai 
Sathyajith 
Sangeetha 
Joe Simon 
Srishailan 
Junior Narasimharaju 
Pailwaan Venu 
Bank suresh 
Stunt Siddu 
Stunt Devu 
Nanjundi Nagaraj

Soundtrack
The music of the film was composed by Raj–Koti.

References

1994 films
1990s Kannada-language films
Indian comedy films
Films scored by Raj–Koti
Films directed by Dwarakish